DVRs by Charter communications

LG

 LG Watch Urbane LTE - 2015, single smartwatch known to use webOS, as LG used Android Wear on its other watches
 All LG televisions released in 2015 and onward and some 2014 televisions.

HP
HP Veer 
HP Pre3
HP TouchPad

Palm
Palm Pre 
Palm Pixi
Palm Pre Plus 
Palm Pixi Plus
Palm Press

WebOS devices
devices